Sticherus cunninghamii, also known as the waekura or umbrella fern, is a New Zealand native fern characterised by its drooping fronds that resemble an umbrella. The fronds are 15–30 cm long and it has an erect stalk between 20 and 50 cm high.

The fern is found from lowland to mountainous forest in dry areas often with infertile soil. The sap is used in traditional Māori Rongoā herbal medicine, and is claimed to have narcotic effects.

References 

Gleicheniales
Ferns of New Zealand